The Taiwanese mole shrew (Anourosorex yamashinai) is one of four species of  red-toothed shrews in the genus Anourosorex. It is endemic to Taiwan.

References

Anourosorex
Mammals described in 1935
Mammals of Taiwan
Endemic fauna of Taiwan